Naujoji Banga ('New Wave') was a Lithuanian-language fortnightly newspaper published in Montevideo, Uruguay, from 1931 to 1940. Naujoji Banga was the organ of the Lithuanian Socialist Federation, the Lithuanian branch of the Socialist Party of Uruguay.

References

1931 establishments in Uruguay
1940 disestablishments in Uruguay
Defunct newspapers published in Uruguay
Lithuanian-language newspapers
Lithuania–Uruguay relations
Mass media in Montevideo
Publications established in 1931
Publications disestablished in 1940
Socialist newspapers